St Charles Borromeo is a parish in the Roman Catholic Diocese of Middlesbrough and is the oldest post-reformation Catholic Church in the city of Kingston upon Hull, England. The church is a Grade I listed building, having been upgraded from a Grade II* in March 2016.

History
Around 1774, Fr Charles Howard came from Marton to serve the small number of Catholics in Hull. In 1779 a chapel was established in Posterngate but it was destroyed in the Gordon Riots of 1780. Following the loss of the chapel Catholics were forced to meet in private until in 1798 when Fr Pierre Foucher arrived in Hull, fleeing the French Revolution. He was a wealthy man, possibly an aristocrat. He paid for a small chapel in North Street to be built from his own funds. He returned to France in 1820.

Fr John Smith was appointed to replace Fr Foucher. He obtained a site in Jarratt Street and began the construction of the present church. The church opened on 29 July 1829. The building of the church was begun by the architect John Earle (1778–1863). It was remodelled soon afterward by J. J. Scoles.

In later years the aisles were added and the present decor seen in the church was undertaken in 1899 under the stewardship of Canon Sullivan.

Organ

The present organ was bought for St Charles' in about 1866. It had been built for St John's Church, Hull in either 1812 or 1815. Before being placed in St Charles' it had been at St Wilfrid's York. It was rebuilt and the design was modified by Messrs Forster and Andrews in 1909. The organ was further amended in 1959.

List of organists
Mr. Cummins, 1829–1833
T. F. Hewitt, 1833–????
Richard W. Hall
James Vincent Bregazzi, 1857–????
Miss Jenny Cudworth
James Vincent Bregazzi, ????–1869
F. R. Muller, 1869–1874
James Vincent Bregazzi, 1874–1900
Edward Hunter
Louis Hermann
J. F. Harper
H. F. Fawcett

Schools
Two schools have links with the Church. These are St Charles Roman Catholic School on Norfolk Street and St Mary's College on Cranbrook Avenue.

Interior decoration

References

External links

Official Website

Saint Charles Borromeo
Grade I listed churches in the East Riding of Yorkshire
Roman Catholic churches in the East Riding of Yorkshire
19th-century Roman Catholic church buildings in the United Kingdom
Grade I listed Roman Catholic churches in England
Roman Catholic churches completed in 1829